Bill Ervin was a NASCAR Grand National Series driver from the American community of Tellico Plains, Tennessee.

Career
He participated in 124 races during his three seasons (1967, 1968, and 1969) of NASCAR action. While never winning a race, Ervin managed to start an average of 22nd and finish in an average of 19th place. His total career earnings were $2,805 ($ when adjusted for inflation).

Bill Ervin's most successful races came on short track where finishes of 18th-place were considered to be routine. His weakness was dirt tracks; where he would find himself finishing in a humbling 26th place on average.

The #31 Newman Long-owned Ford vehicle would become the primary vehicle of Bill Ervin during his NASCAR Cup Series career.

References

NASCAR drivers
People from Tellico Plains, Tennessee
Racing drivers from Tennessee
Living people
1932 births